The 2017 Serie A Playoffs are the final phase of the 2016–17 Serie A season. They started on 12 May and ended in June 2017 with the Finals. Playoffs' Quarter-finals will begin on May 12, the Semi-finals on May 25 and the Finals on June 10, 2017.

EA7 Emporio Armani Milano were the defending champions.

Umana Reyer Venezia won their 3rd title by beating Dolomiti Energia Trento in game 6 of the finals.

Qualified teams
The eight first qualified teams after the end of the regular season qualified to the playoffs.

Bracket
 As of 20 June 2017.

Quarterfinals
The quarterfinals will be played in a best of five format.

EA7 Emporio Armani Milano v Betaland Capo d'Orlando

Dolomiti Energia Trento v Banco di Sardegna Sassari

Sidigas Avellino v Grissin Bon Reggio Emilia

Umana Reyer Venezia v The Flexx Pistoia

Semifinals
The semifinals are played in a best of seven format.

EA7 Emporio Armani Milano v Dolomiti Energia Trento

Umana Reyer Venezia v Sidigas Avellino

Finals

The finals will be played in a best of seven format.

References

External links
Official website

2016–17 in Italian basketball
LBA Playoffs